Kyriakos Velopoulos (born 24 October 1965) is a Greek politician and Hellenic Parliament member and Greek Solution party leader, as well as television personality and author.

Early life and education 

He was born in West Germany and grew up in Thessaloniki, Greece. After his graduation from Dendropotamos high school, he studied journalism at the Center of Liberal Philosophical Social Studies (a private educational institution) in Thessaloniki under a scholarship and graduated from there in 1990.

He earned a bachelor's degree on Greek civilization studies from the Open University of Cyprus in 2013 and a master's degree in journalism from the same university in 2016.

During his compulsory military service in the Hellenic Army, he served as an officer on the islands of North-Eastern Aegean Sea, and the Greek mainland. He is a member of the Academy of the Greek language in Germany and a member of the Union of Writers of Northern Greece. He was a member of ONNED, the youth organisation of New Democracy (ND) until 1988 and ideologically defines himself as belonging to the "patriotic ND".

Political career 
He was a member of the LAOS, the far-right party of Georgios Karatzaferis where he was a candidate in the 2004 Greek parliamentary elections, taking 5,700 votes. But he failed to be elected, because LAOS received only 2.19% of votes. In the regional elections of 2006, he was a candidate as Governor of Pella Prefecture where he came third with 7.11% and 2 seats. In the parliamentary elections of 2007 and 2009, he was elected in the B prefecture of Thessaloniki.

From 2016 onwards he is president of the political party Greek Solution "", which won 10 national parliamentary seats in the general elections of July 2019. In the 2019 Εuropean elections, his party gained one seat for the Εuropean parliament.

Velopoulos has raised objections about the indictment of Golden Dawn's members and he has characterised the arrests of them as a well-played plot οrchestrated "by the domestic government and judicial system".

Journalism 
As a journalist he has worked in a number of radio and television stations, such as "TV Thessaloniki", "Ερμής", "Best", "Top", "Opion" , "TeleAsty", where he presented his two major shows "Η Βουλή" and "Ελληνόραμα", in which he promotes his books. Today he is presenter and owner of "Alert TV" channel.

Work as an author 
He is the author of Greece Bleeds, which he claims deals with the corruption of Greek society, army, legal system and politics, and Alexander, the Greatest of the Greeks, a detailed biography of Alexander the Great which includes arguments on the subject's Greek origins.

Controversy

Transferring €400,000 abroad during crisis 
In 2012 it was revealed that he had sent the amount of €400,000 abroad, amid fears of Greece defaulting.

Selling epistles by Jesus Christ 
In 2014, Velopoulos began selling pseudepigrapha which he described as "authentic epistles from Jesus Christ" through his telemarketing show. This elicited widespread criticism from the Greek academic community and mainstream media, which disputed the historicity of these particular  artifacts and accused Velopoulos of misleading consumers. Velopoulos initially denied having engaged in the sale of the letters, later acknowledging the fact and stating that he would continue to sell them, claiming that his critics lacked the knowledge necessary to dispute the letter's authenticity. He supported that the epistles are authentic and kept in monasteries of Mount Athos.

References

1965 births
Living people
Greek television personalities
Greek MPs 2007–2009
Popular Orthodox Rally politicians
Greek Solution politicians
Greek Solution MEPs
Greek MPs 2009–2012
MPs of Thessaloniki
MEPs for Greece 2019–2024
Politicians from Thessaloniki
Greek MPs 2019–2023